Peter Tait (19 October 1906 – 22 April 1980) was a Scotland international rugby union player.

Rugby Union career

Amateur career

Tait played for Royal HSFP.

Provincial career

Tait was capped for Edinburgh District.

He was supposed to play for the Scotland Probables in the first trial match of season 1937-38. The match due on 18 December 1937 was called off due to frost despite the contingency of straw being placed on The Greenyards pitch at Melrose. He did however turn out for the Scotland Probables side for the second and final trial match of that season, on 15 January 1938.

International career

Tait played in only one match for Scotland, in 1935 against England at Murrayfield.

References

1906 births
1980 deaths
Rugby union players from Edinburgh
Scottish rugby union players
Scotland international rugby union players
Royal HSFP players
Edinburgh District (rugby union) players
Scotland Probables players
Rugby union hookers